Carl Conjola (5 February 1773 – 19 November 1831) was a German landscape painter in water colours and oil. He was born in Mannheim, and died in Munich.

By way of support from Charles Theodore, Elector of Bavaria, he studied painting in Munich, where he was a pupil of Jakob Dorner. He painted mainly landscapes of Bavaria, Tyrol and Switzerland.

See also
 List of German painters

References

1773 births
1831 deaths
18th-century German painters
18th-century German male artists
German male painters
19th-century German painters
Artists from Mannheim
19th-century German male artists